In United States and Canadian aviation, the Aeronautical Information Manual (AIM) (formerly the Airman's Information Manual) is the respective nation's official guide to basic flight information and air traffic control procedures.

These manuals contains the fundamentals required in order to fly legally in the country of origin. They also contain items of interest to pilots concerning health and medical facts, factors affecting flight safety, a pilot/controller glossary of terms used in the ATC System, and information on safety, accident, and hazard reporting.  Although the AIMs are not regulatory in nature, parts of them re-state and amplify federal regulations.

United States 
In the United States, the AIM is published by the Federal Aviation Administration, and contains ten chapters, as follows:

Air Navigation
Aeronautical Lighting and Other Airport Visual Aids
Airspace
Air Traffic Control
Air Traffic Procedures
Emergency Procedures
Safety of Flight
Medical Facts for Pilots
Aeronautical Charts and Related Publications
Helicopter Operations

The AIMs text and images are produced by the FAA, and are available in electronic form. Several commercial enterprises sell typeset books containing the AIM, usually in combination with those chapters of the Federal regulations that are particularly important to pilots. The books are usually called "FAR/AIM".

Canada 
In Canada, the AIM is published by Transport Canada, and contains the following chapters:
General (GEN)
Aerodromes (AGA)
Communications (COM)
Meteorology (MET)
Rules of the Air and Air Traffic Services (RAC)
North Atlantic Operations (NAT)
Search and Rescue (SAR)
Aeronautical Charts and Publications (MAP)
Licensing, Registration and Airworthiness (LRA)
Airmanship (AIR)
Remotely Piloted Aircraft (RPA)

New editions of the AIM are published twice a year, usually in April and October.

References

External links
 Latest version of online AIM on the FAA's website
 Transport Canada AIM

Aviation in the United States
Aviation in Canada
Aviation books
Aviation publications